Johnny Davis may refer to:

Johnny Davis (basketball, born 1955), American former basketball player and coach
Johnny Davis (basketball, born 2002), American basketball player
Johnny Davis (American football) (born 1956), retired American football player
Johnny Davis (Australian footballer) (1876–1944), Australian rules footballer
Johnny Davis (kickboxer) (born 1962), American kickboxer
Johnny Davis (baseball, born 1917) (1917–1982), American outfielder in Negro league baseball
Johnny Davis (baseball, born 1990), American professional baseball outfielder
Johnny Davis, team owner of JD Motorsports
Johnnie Davis (1910–1983), American actor musician

See also
John Davis (disambiguation)